Tosin Adeloye (born 7 February 1996) is a Nigerian sprinter. She competed in the 400 metres event at the 2015 World Championships in Athletics in Beijing, China.

Doping ban
Adeloye tested positive for the anabolic steroid Metenolone at the National Sports Festival in Lagos in December 2012, at the age of 16, and was subsequently banned from sports for two years. The ban ended 6 January 2015.

She received a second ban for eight years after another failed test in 2016.

References

External links

1996 births
Living people
Place of birth missing (living people)
Nigerian female sprinters
World Athletics Championships athletes for Nigeria
Nigerian sportspeople in doping cases
Doping cases in athletics
African Games gold medalists for Nigeria
African Games medalists in athletics (track and field)
Athletes (track and field) at the 2015 African Games
21st-century Nigerian women